The 1989 U.S. Open was the 89th U.S. Open, held June 15–18 at the East Course of Oak Hill Country Club near Rochester, New York. Curtis Strange won his second consecutive U.S. Open, one stroke ahead of runners-up Chip Beck, Mark McCumber, and Ian Woosnam, becoming the first successful defender of a U.S. Open title since Ben Hogan in 1951. Strange became the sixth player to defend the U.S. Open title. This was the last of his 17 wins on the PGA Tour.

Heavy rains before the tournament allowed for some low scores in the early rounds, with a record 38 under-par rounds in the first two rounds. During the second round, four players (Jerry Pate, Nick Price, Doug Weaver, and Mark Wiebe) recorded holes-in-one at the downhill  6th hole. All four hit a 7-iron past the flag, taking advantage of the damp conditions.  The rest of the field had thirty birdies at the hole during the second round.

Gary Player, the 1965 champion and winner of nine major titles, played in his final U.S. Open in 1989. He shot 78-69=147 and missed the cut by two strokes.

This was the third U.S. Open and the fourth major at the East Course. Previous U.S. Opens were in 1956 (Cary Middlecoff) and 1968 (Lee Trevino), and the PGA Championship in 1980 (Jack Nicklaus). It later hosted the Ryder Cup in 1995 and the PGA Championship in 2003 and 2013.

Course layout

East Course

Source:

Previous course lengths for major championships
  - par 70, 1980 PGA Championship
  - par 70, 1968 U.S. Open
  - par 70, 1956 U.S. Open

Past champions in the field

Made the cut

Missed the cut

Source:

Round summaries

First round
Thursday, June 15, 1989

Second round
Friday, June 16, 1989

Strange fired a six-under 64 in the second round to tie the course record, set in 1942 by Hogan, and take the 36-hole lead.

Source:

Amateurs: Sigel (+13), Yarian (+38).

Third round
Saturday, June 17, 1989

Overnight rains thoroughly soaked the already saturated course and caused a delay in the start. Instead of pairs, the players went off on split tees in groupings of three, a first at the U.S. Open. A 73 (+3) in the third round dropped Strange to three back of Tom Kite, whose first three rounds were in the 60s.

Source:

Final round
Sunday, June 18, 1989

Kite led by three after four holes in the final round, but a triple bogey at the 5th hole and bogeys at 8 and 10  dropped him a stroke back of Strange.  Double bogeys at 13 and 15 dropped him from contention. Kite recorded a 78 (+8) and finished in ninth place. Strange played steadily in the penultimate pairing, with fifteen consecutive pars until a birdie at the 16th, his first since the second round. Despite a three-putt for bogey at the 18th, Strange held on for a one-stroke win and a second straight U.S. Open title.

Source:

Scorecard
Final round

Cumulative tournament scores, relative to par
{|class="wikitable" span = 50 style="font-size:85%;
|-
|style="background: Pink;" width=10|
|Birdie
|style="background: PaleGreen;" width=10|
|Bogey
|style="background: Green;" width=10|
|Double bogey
|style="background: Olive;" width=10|
|Triple bogey+
|}
Source:

References

External links
USOpen.com – 1989

U.S. Open (golf)
Golf in New York (state)
Sports in Rochester, New York
U.S. Open
U.S. Open (golf)
U.S. Open (golf)
U.S. Open (golf)
Events in Rochester, New York